Julia Frances Newbern-Langford (April 4, 1913 – July 11, 2005) was an American singer and actress who was popular during the Golden Age of Radio and made film and television appearances for over two decades.

She was known as the "GI Nightingale", an American armed-forces sweetheart, who entertained troops touring often with Bob Hope.

Discovery
Langford originally trained as an opera singer. While a young girl she required a tonsillectomy that changed her soprano range to a rich contralto. As a result, she was forced to change her vocal approach to a more contemporary big band, popular music style.  At age 17, she was singing for local dances. Cigar manufacturer Eli Witt heard her sing at an American Legion party and hired her to sing on a local radio show he sponsored.

Radio
After a brief stint in the Broadway musical "Here Goes the Bride" in 1931, she moved to Hollywood, appearing on Louella Parsons' radio show Hollywood Hotel while starting a movie career. Singing for radio during the early 1930s she was heard by Rudy Vallée, who invited her to become a regular on his radio show. From 1935 until 1938 she was a regular performer on Dick Powell's radio show. From 1946 to 1951, she performed with Don Ameche as the insufferable wife, Blanche, on the radio comedy The Bickersons.

Films
Langford made her film debut in Every Night at Eight (1935), introducing what became her signature song: "I'm in the Mood for Love". She then began appearing frequently in films such as Broadway Melody of 1936 (1935) (in which she popularized "Broadway Rhythm" and "You Are My Lucky Star"), Born to Dance (1936), Too Many Girls (1940) (in which she acted alongside her childhood schoolmate from Lakeland Dan White), and Yankee Doodle Dandy (1942) with James Cagney, in which (portraying Nora Bayes) she performed the popular song "Over There". She also appeared on screen in Dixie Jamboree and Radio Stars on Parade.  In 1946 she played the torch-singing lead in The Bamboo Blonde, showing off her ability to both vamp and act.

In a Western movie, Deputy Marshal, she co-starred with her first husband, matinee idol Jon Hall. In several of Langford's films she appeared as herself, as in Broadway Melody of 1936 and The Glenn Miller Story (1953). In the latter film, she sang "Chattanooga Choo Choo" with the Modernaires and the movie orchestra.

World War II

From 1941, Langford was a regular singer on Bob Hope's The Pepsodent Show when he held his first military entertainment program at March Field in Riverside, California in 1941. The show was so positive, he continued broadcasting from training bases around the country and asked Langford to join him. During World War II, she joined Hope, Jerry Colonna, guitarist Tony Romano, and other performers on USO tours through Europe, North Africa, and the South Pacific, entertaining thousands of GIs throughout the world. During a USO tour in the Pacific theater, she was invited to take a ride in a P-38 fighter plane. During the flight, a Japanese ship was spotted and the joy ride was postponed until the pilot finished strafing the ship.

In his memoir, Don't Shoot! It's Only Me!, Bob Hope recalled how Frances Langford got the biggest laugh he had ever heard. At a USO show in the South Pacific, Langford stood up on a stage to sing before a huge crowd of GIs. When Langford sang the first line of her signature song, "I'm in the Mood for Love," a soldier in the audience stood up and shouted, "You've come to the right place, honey!"

Also, during the war, Langford wrote the weekly "Purple Heart Diary" column for Hearst Newspapers, in which she described her visits to military hospitals to entertain wounded GIs. She used the weekly column as a means of allowing the recovering troops to voice their complaints, and to ask for public support for making sure that the wounded troops received all the supplies and comforts they needed.

Her association with Hope continued into the 1980s. In 1989 she joined him for a USO tour to entertain troops in the Persian Gulf.

Television

Langford worked for several years in the late 1940s on The Spike Jones Show and starred in a short-lived DuMont variety show Star Time (1950). As a guest on early television shows such as Perry Como and Jackie Gleason she was motivated to venture into television. She was the host of two self-titled variety television programs. She then teamed with Don Ameche for the ABC television program, The Frances Langford/Don Ameche Show (1951), a spin-off of their successful radio series The Bickersons in which the duo played a feuding married couple. Langford was also the host of the NBC musical variety program Frances Langford Presents (1959), which lasted one season, as did a later program The Frances Langford Show (1960). Another notable appearance was in The Honeymooners lost episode "Christmas Party" which first aired December 19, 1953.

Personal life
Langford married three times, first to actor Jon Hall (1934–55). In 1948, they donated  of land near her estate in Jensen Beach, Florida, to the Martin County Board of County Commissioners, which named it Langford Hall Park. Located at 2369 N.E. Dixie Highway, just south of the Stuart Welcome Arch, it is known today simply as Langford Park and is one of the county's major parks.

In 1946, Langford was honored by the hometown of her youth, Lakeland, Florida, for her work with the United Service Organizations (USO) and her music and acting career. The City of Lakeland dedicated the Lake Mirror Promenade as the Frances Langford Promenade. The Promenade was originally built in 1928 and was designed by renowned landscape architect Charles W. Leavitt of New York.

After leaving Hollywood life, she kept up her pastimes of boating and sport fishing. As a nightclub singer in 1955, she married Outboard Marine Corporation president Ralph Evinrude. They lived on her estate in Jensen Beach (which has since been replaced by a housing development), and they built a Polynesian-themed restaurant and marina on the Indian River named The Frances Langford Outrigger Resort, where Langford frequently performed. Locals and celebrities flocked there. It remains open under the name of the Dolphin Bar and Shrimp House, and many of Frances Langford's memorabilia are still on display. Evinrude died in 1986. In 1994, Langford married Harold C. Stuart, who had served as Assistant Secretary for Civil Affairs of the United States Air Force (1949–51) under President Harry S Truman. They spent the summers at Baie Fine in Georgian Bay, Ontario, Canada, traveling from their home in Florida aboard their 110-foot yacht The Chanticleer, which became a popular tourist attraction when moored at the Outrigger Resort.

Health problems plagued her in the last years of her life, requiring periodic hospital stays.  She died at her Jensen Beach home at age 92 from congestive heart failure. According to her wishes, she was cremated and the ashes strewn off the coast of Florida near her residence. Stuart survived Langford (who had no children) and died in 2007 at the age of 94.

Legacy
Langford has two stars on the Hollywood Walk of Fame, one at 1500 Vine Street, which acknowledges her contribution to motion pictures and one at 1525 Vine Street for her work in radio. Both were dedicated February 8, 1960.

Langford was a supportive member of the Jensen Beach, Florida, community and constantly donated money to it. She was a philanthropist and her generosity to the Florida Oceanographic Society located on Hutchinson Island in Stuart was well known. The site provides education and research of the ocean, reefs and environment in the Florida area. The visitor's center bears her name and also houses some of her artifacts. Her collection of mounted tuna, marlin and other fish adorn the walls.

In 2006, the Frances Langford Heart Center, made possible by a bequest from her estate, opened at Martin Memorial Hospital in Stuart, Florida.

Filmography

 The Subway Symphony (1932, Short) as Herself
 Rambling 'Round Radio Row #5 (1933, Short) as Herself – Singer
 Every Night at Eight (1935) as Susan Moore
 Broadway Melody of 1936 (1935) as Herself
 Collegiate (1936) as Miss Hay
 Palm Springs (1936) as Joan Smyth
 Sunkist Stars at Palm Springs (1936, Short) as Herself
 Born to Dance (1936) as 'Peppy' Turner
 The Hit Parade (1937) as Ruth Allison
 Hollywood Hotel (1937) as Alice
 Dreaming Out Loud (1940) as Alice
 Too Many Girls (1940) as Eileen Eilers
 Hit Parade of 1941 (1940) as Pat Abbott / Singing voice of Anabelle Potter
 All-American Co-Ed (1941) as Virginia Collinge
 Swing It Soldier (1941) as Patricia Loring / Evelyn Loring Waters
 Picture People No. 4: Stars Day Off (1941, Documentary short) as Herself
 Mississippi Gambler (1942) as Beth Cornell
 Picture People No. 10: Hollywood at Home (1942, Documentary short) as Herself
 Yankee Doodle Dandy (1942) as Nora Bayes
 Hedda Hopper's Hollywood No. 4 (1942, Documentary short) as Herself
 Combat America (1943, Documentary) as Herself
 Follow the Band (1943) as Herself
 Cowboy in Manhattan (1943) as Babs Lee
 This Is the Army (1943) as Herself
 Never a Dull Moment (1943) as Julie Russell
 Career Girl (1944) as Joan Terry
 Memo for Joe (1944, Short documentary) as Herself
 Dixie Jamboree (1944) as Susan Jackson
 Girl Rush (1944) as Flo Daniels
 Radio Stars on Parade (1945) as Sally Baker
 People Are Funny (1946) as Frances Langford
 Screen Snapshots: Hollywood Victory Show (1946, Documentary short) as Herself
 The Bamboo Blonde (1946) as Louise Anderson
 Beat the Band (1947) as Ann Rogers
 Melody Time (1948) as Herself (singing voice, segment: "Once Upon a Wintertime")
 Deputy Marshal (1949) as Janet Masters
 Purple Heart Diary (1951) as Herself
 The Glenn Miller Story (1954) as Herself
-

DVD release
Frances Langford is featured on the DVD Entertaining the Troops with Bob Hope.

References

External links

 
 Frances Langford profile
 Internet Archive: Maxwell House Coffee Time (1947): Frances Langford (13 episodes)
 
 Zoot Radio, free old time radio show downloads of 'The Francis Langford' radio program
 Frances Langford recordings at the Discography of American Historical Recordings.

1913 births
2005 deaths
Musicians from Lakeland, Florida
American film actresses
American radio actresses
People from Jensen Beach, Florida
Torch singers
Traditional pop music singers
20th-century American actresses
20th-century American singers
Singers from Florida
Actresses from Florida
Lakeland High School (Lakeland, Florida) alumni
Nightclub performers
People from Citrus County, Florida
20th-century American women singers
21st-century American women
United Service Organizations entertainers